Paul-Henri Mathieu was the defending champion, but lost in the second round to Marin Čilić.

Unseeded Victor Hănescu won in the final 6–3, 6–4, against seventh-seeded Igor Andreev.

Seeds
The top four seeds receive a bye into the second round.

Draw

Finals

Top half

Bottom half

External links
Draw
Qualifying draw

Singles